Enlarged to Show Detail is a 1996 documentary created by the multi-genred band 311. The set contains a documentary (first released on VHS in 1996 and in 2001 on DVD) and a bonus CD EP. This was the first video documenting their experiences as a band promoting peace and a positive outlook on life. It features backstage footage, clips of music videos and live concert footage.

Enlarged to Show Detail was certified as a Platinum selling video by the RIAA.

Bonus CD EP

The second disc is a CD EP that includes the following tracks that are studio outtakes from the band's self-titled third album.  It was produced by the band and Ron Saint Germain.
Tribute 	4:16
Let The Cards Fall 	3:27
Gap 	2:10
Firewater 	3:32

References

Documentary films about rock music and musicians
311 video albums
1996 EPs
1996 video albums